The 1969 Estonian SSR Football Championship was won by Dvigatel.

League table

References
rsssf

Estonian Football Championship
Est
Football